The Society of the Friends of the Rights of Man and of the Citizen, mainly known as Cordeliers Club, was a populist political club during the French Revolution from 1790 to 1794, when the Reign of Terror ended and the Thermidorian Reaction began.

The club campaigned for universal male suffrage and direct democracy, including the referendum. It energetically served as a watchdog looking for signs of abuse of power by the men in power. By 1793, it was challenging the centralization of power by Robespierre and his Committee of Public Safety. They responded by arresting the leadership, charging them with conspiring to overthrow the Convention. The leaders were guillotined, and the club disappeared.

History 

The club had its origins in the Cordeliers district, a famously radical area of Paris called, by Camille Desmoulins, "the only sanctuary where liberty has not been violated". Under the leadership of Georges Danton, this district had played a significant role in the Storming of the Bastille and was home to several notable figures of the Revolution, including Danton himself, Desmoulins and Jean-Paul Marat—on whose behalf the district placed itself in a state of civil rebellion, when in January 1790 it refused to allow the execution of a warrant for his arrest that had been issued by the Châtelet.

Having issued in November 1789 a declaration affirming its intent to "oppose, as much as we are able, all that the representatives of the Commune may undertake that is harmful to the general rights of our constituents", the Cordeliers district remained in conflict with the Parisian government throughout the winter and spring of 1790. In May and June 1790, the previous division of Paris into 60 districts was by decree of the National Assembly replaced by the creation of 48 sections. This restructuring abolished the Cordeliers district.

Anticipating this dissolution, the leaders of the Cordeliers district founded in April 1790 the Société des Amis des droits de l’homme et du citoyen, a popular society which would serve as an alternative means of pursuing the goals and interests of the district. This society held its meetings in the Cordeliers Convent and quickly became known as the Club des Cordeliers. It took as its motto the phrase Liberté, égalité, fraternité, and because its aim was to keep an eye on the government its emblem was an open eye.

The membership fees of this society were fixed low and thus affordable to a more diverse range of citizens than those of many other political clubs at the time, including the Jacobin Club. There were no other restrictions on membership. The Cordeliers presented themselves as exceptionally populist and they prided themselves on counting working men and women among their members. A contemporary account describes one meeting: About three hundred persons of both sexes filled the place; their dress was so unkempt and so filthy that one would have taken them for a gathering of beggars. The Declaration of the Rights of Man was stuck on the wall, crowned by crossed daggers. Plaster busts of Brutus and William Tell were placed on each side, as if expressly to guard the Declaration. Facing, behind the tribune, as supporters, there appeared busts of Mirabeau and Helvétius, with Rousseau in the middle.

However, the preponderance of Cordeliers were members of the bourgeoisie and its leadership was largely drawn from the educated middle classes.

From 1791 the Cordeliers met in a hall in the Rue Dauphine. On 21 June of that year, following an attempt by the royal family to flee Paris, the Cordeliers moved to draft a petition which offered the National Assembly a choice between the immediate deposition of Louis XVI or a national referendum on the future of the monarchy. The Cordeliers actively moved against the majority interests in this case. Large demonstrations in support of this and similar petitions led to civil unrest, and culminated in the Champ de Mars massacre on 17 July. The National Guard, led by the Marquis de Lafayette, fired on the protestors, resulting in the deaths of at least dozen of them. Subsequent action taken against the Cordeliers included the closing of the Cordeliers Convent to them and the issuing of arrest warrants for Danton and Desmoulins. Despite these measures, the society remained a highly influential force in Parisian politics.

The Cordeliers participated significantly in the planning and execution of the 10 August 1792 insurrection. Danton, at this time perhaps the most powerful figure within the Cordeliers Club, acted—in Hilaire Belloc's words—as "the organizer and chief of the insurrection" and was appointed Minister of Justice in the government that resulted, with Desmoulins and Fabre d'Églantine—both prominent members of the Cordeliers Club—as his secretaries.

Subsequent to this insurrection and to the September Massacres that followed closely on its heels, the Cordeliers Club became increasingly the province of ultra-revolutionary factions, particularly the Hébertists, who advocated extreme measures to intensify the Terror.

In December 1793, Desmoulins began publishing a journal entitled Le Vieux Cordelier or "Old Cordelier", which attempted to reclaim the title of the society from those who had associated it with extremism. In the seven numbers of the journal, Desmoulins attacked the Hébertists and called for an end to the Terror, comparing revolutionary Paris to Rome under the tyrants. The Hébertists were arrested and on 24 March 1794 and executed, but less extreme Desmoulins, Danton and the "Old Cordeliers" of the Dantonist faction quickly followed them to the guillotine. Their execution took place on April 16 (April 5). The Cordeliers Club, deprived of its most important members, initially played no role in the further course of the revolution. After the Jacobin Club closed in November 1794, its most vehement representatives (so-called Cretans) joined the Cordeliers. In response, the Thermidorians arranged for its final closure on the 20th of Pluviose III (February 20, 1795).

Bibliography 
The papers emanating from the Cordeliers are enumerated in Jean Maurice Tourneux, Bibliographie de l'histoire de Paris pendant la Révolution (1894), i. (on the trial of the Hébertists) Nos. 4204–4210, ii. Nos. 9795–9834 and 11,813. See also A. Bougeart Les Cordeliers, documents pour servir a l'histoire de la Révolution (Caen, 1891); G. Lenotre, Paris révolutionnaire (Paris, 1895); G. Tridon, Les Hébertistes, plainte contre une calomnie de l'histoire (Paris, 1864). The last-named author was condemned to four months' prison; his work was reprinted in 1871. The inventory of the pictures found in 1790 in the Cordeliers Convent was published by J. Guiffrey in Nouvelles archives de l’art français, viii., 2nd series, iii. (1880).

Factions and members 
 Hébertists or Exaggerateds (radicalism)
 Jacques René Hébert (leader)
 Antoine-François Momoro
 Charles-Philippe Ronsin
 Pierre Gaspard Chaumette
 Jean-Baptiste-Joseph Gobel
 Marie-Joseph Chénier
 François-Nicolas Vincent
 Jean Baptiste Noël Bouchotte
 Dantonists or Indulgents (moderatism)
 Georges Jacques Danton (leader)
 Camille Desmoulins
 Pierre Philippeaux
 Bertrand Barère
 Fabre d'Églantine
 Pierre-François-Joseph Robert
 Pierre Choderlos de Laclos
 Non-affiliated extremists
 Jean-Paul Marat (leader)
 Jean-Baptiste Carrier
 François Chabot
 Stanislas-Marie Maillard
 Theroigne de Mericourt

See also 
 Society of the Friends of Truth

Further reading 
 Belloc, Hilaire. Danton: A Study. New York: Charles Scribner's Sons, 1899.
 Castelot, André & Decaux, Alain. Le Grand Dictionnaire d'Histoire de la France. Paris: Éditions Fayard, 1979 .
 Hammersley, Rachel. French Revolutionaries and English Republicans: The Cordeliers Club 1790–1794. Rochester: Boydell & Brewer Inc., 2005.
 Hammersley, Rachel. "English Republicanism in Revolutionary France: The Case of the Cordelier Club." Journal of British Studies 43.4 (2004): 464-481. online
 Hammersley, Rachel. "Camille Desmoulins's Le Vieux Cordelier: a link between English and French republicanism." History of European ideas 27.2 (2001): 115-132.
 Rose, Robert Barrie. The Making of the Sans-Culottes. Manchester: Manchester University Press, 1983.

Notes 

1790 establishments in France
1794 disestablishments in France
Groups of the French Revolution
Left-wing populism in France
Populist parties
Political parties disestablished in 1794
Political parties established in 1790
Far-left politics in France
Radical parties in France